The Deputy Chief Minister of Madhya Pradesh is a member of the Cabinet of Madhya Pradesh Government in the Government of Madhya Pradesh. Not a constitutional office, it seldom carries any specific powers. A deputy chief minister usually also holds a cabinet portfolio such as home minister or finance minister. In the parliamentary system of government, the Chief Minister is treated as the "first among equals" in the cabinet; the position of deputy chief minister is used to bring political stability and strength within a coalition government.

List of Deputy Chief Ministers

See also 
 List of current Indian deputy chief ministers

References

Deputy Chief Ministers of Madhya Pradesh
Madhya Pradesh
Lists of people from Madhya Pradesh